Shut Eye is an American drama streaming television series created by Leslie Bohem, airing on the streaming service Hulu. It was given a straight-to-series 10-episode order. All ten episodes became available on December 7, 2016. A second season was ordered on March 20, 2017 which was released on December 6, 2017. The series originally was led by David Hudgins as showrunner during season one before he was replaced by John Shiban for season two. On January 30, 2018, the series was canceled after two seasons.

Premise
The series centers around the life of failed magician Charlie Haverford (Jeffrey Donovan), who now works as a psychic and suddenly starts to have real visions.

Cast and characters

Main
 Jeffrey Donovan as Charlie Haverford
 KaDee Strickland as Linda Haverford, Charlie's wife
 Angus Sampson as Fonso Marks - Rita's son
 David Zayas as Eduardo Bernal
 Susan Misner as Dr. Nora White, a neuroscientist
 Emmanuelle Chriqui as Gina, a hypnotist 
 Isabella Rossellini as Rita Marks - Matriarch
 Dylan Ray Schmid as Nick Haverford - Son
 Havana Guppy as Drina Marks

Recurring
 Layla Alizada as Simza
 Mel Harris as Nadine Davies
 Zak Santiago as White Tony
 Aasif Mandvi as Pazhani 'Paz' Kapoor

Episodes

Season 1 (2016)

Season 2 (2017)

Production
Following the first season, John Shiban replaced David Hudgins as showrunner.

Music
The series' musical score was composed by Ben Decter. He was replaced by Joseph Stephens for Season 2.

See also
List of original programs distributed by Hulu

References

External links
 
 

2016 American television series debuts
2017 American television series endings
Hulu original programming
2010s American crime drama television series
English-language television shows
Lesbian-related television shows
Television series by Sony Pictures Television